Chagongwe is a town and administrative ward in Gairo District in the Morogoro Region of  Tanzania, East Africa. As of 2002, the population of the ward was 7,337. There is a government-run dispensary and a primary school there. The only access to the town is over a single lane, unimproved road.

The ward consists of the town of Chagongwe and two villages, Mkobwe and Lufikiri. Each of these has denominated rural areas or small villages under them.

Notes

Populated places in Morogoro Region
Wards of Morogoro Region